Savara may refer to:

Savara people or Sora people
Savara language (Munda), or Sora, in India
Savara language (Dravidian), in India
Savara (moth), a genus of moths in the family Erebidae
Savara, a planet in the computer game Tyrian